The following species in the flowering plant genus Oxalis, many of which are called wood sorrels, woodsorrels or woodsorrels, false shamrocks, and sourgrasses, are recognised by Plants of the World Online:

Oxalis abercornensis 
Oxalis acetosella 
Oxalis acromelaena 
Oxalis acuminata 
Oxalis adenodes 
Oxalis adenophylla 
Oxalis adspersa 
Oxalis alata 
Oxalis albicans 
Oxalis albiuscula 
Oxalis algoensis 
Oxalis alpina 
Oxalis alstonii 
Oxalis alvimii 
Oxalis amamiana 
Oxalis ambigua 
Oxalis amblyodonta 
Oxalis amblyosepala 
Oxalis andina 
Oxalis androsacea 
Oxalis annae 
Oxalis anomala 
Oxalis anthelmintica 
Oxalis aptera 
Oxalis apurimacensis 
Oxalis arachnoidea 
Oxalis arbuscula 
Oxalis arenaria 
Oxalis areolata 
Oxalis argentina 
Oxalis argillacea 
Oxalis argyrophylla 
Oxalis aridicola 
Oxalis artemioides 
Oxalis articulata 
Oxalis atacamensis 
Oxalis attaquana 
Oxalis aurea 
Oxalis aureoflava 
Oxalis ausensis 
Oxalis bakeriana 
Oxalis balansae 
Oxalis barrelieri 
Oxalis bartolomensis 
Oxalis bela-vitoriae 
Oxalis benjaminii 
Oxalis bermejensis 
Oxalis bifida 
Oxalis bifrons 
Oxalis bifurca 
Oxalis bipartita 
Oxalis bisecta 
Oxalis bisfracta 
Oxalis blackii 
Oxalis blanchetii 
Oxalis blastorhiza 
Oxalis bojeriana 
Oxalis boliviana 
Oxalis bowiei 
Oxalis brasiliensis 
Oxalis bulbigera 
Oxalis bulbillifera 
Oxalis bulbocastanum 
Oxalis bullulata 
Oxalis burkei 
Oxalis burtoniae 
Oxalis caerulea 
Oxalis caesariata 
Oxalis caesia 
Oxalis cajalbanensis 
Oxalis calachaccensis 
Oxalis californica 
Oxalis callosa 
Oxalis calva 
Oxalis calviniensis 
Oxalis camelopardalis 
Oxalis campicola 
Oxalis campylorhiza 
Oxalis canaliculata 
Oxalis capillacea 
Oxalis caprina 
Oxalis cardenasiana 
Oxalis carminea 
Oxalis carolina 
Oxalis cathara 
Oxalis caucensis 
Oxalis cerradoana 
Oxalis chachahuensis 
Oxalis chamaecrista 
Oxalis chapmaniae 
Oxalis chartacea 
Oxalis chasquiensis 
Oxalis chnoodes 
Oxalis ciliaris 
Oxalis ciliata 
Oxalis cinerea 
Oxalis clandestina 
Oxalis clausenii 
Oxalis clavifolia 
Oxalis clematodes 
Oxalis colatinensis 
Oxalis colchaguensis 
Oxalis colorea 
Oxalis commutata 
Oxalis comosa 
Oxalis compacta 
Oxalis compressa 
Oxalis comptonii 
Oxalis confertifolia 
Oxalis confertissima 
Oxalis conorrhiza 
Oxalis conventionensis 
Oxalis convexula 
Oxalis copiosa 
Oxalis coralleoides 
Oxalis cordata 
Oxalis corniculata 
Oxalis cotagaitensis 
Oxalis cratensis 
Oxalis creaseyi 
Oxalis crispula 
Oxalis crocea 
Oxalis cuatrecasasii 
Oxalis cuneata 
Oxalis cuzcensis 
Oxalis cytisoides 
Oxalis daitunensis 
Oxalis davyana 
Oxalis debilis 
Oxalis decaphylla 
Oxalis dehradunensis 
Oxalis densa 
Oxalis densifolia 
Oxalis depressa 
Oxalis deserticola 
Oxalis diamantinae 
Oxalis dichondrifolia 
Oxalis dichotoma 
Oxalis dilatata 
Oxalis dillenii 
Oxalis dimidiata 
Oxalis dines 
Oxalis discolor 
Oxalis disticha 
Oxalis distincta 
Oxalis divaricata 
Oxalis divergens 
Oxalis doceana 
Oxalis dolichopoda 
Oxalis dombeyi 
Oxalis dregei 
Oxalis dreyerae 
Oxalis droseroides 
Oxalis drummondii 
Oxalis dudleyi 
Oxalis dumetorum 
Oxalis duriuscula 
Oxalis ebracteata 
Oxalis eckloniana 
Oxalis ecuadorensis 
Oxalis elegans 
Oxalis elsae 
Oxalis engleriana 
Oxalis enneaphylla 
Oxalis eremobia 
Oxalis ericifolia 
Oxalis ericoides 
Oxalis eriocarpa 
Oxalis eriolepis 
Oxalis erosa 
Oxalis erythrorhiza 
Oxalis exilis 
Oxalis exserta 
Oxalis extensa 
Oxalis falcatula 
Oxalis famatinae 
Oxalis fendleri 
Oxalis fenestrata 
Oxalis fergusoniae 
Oxalis fibrosa 
Oxalis filifoliolata 
Oxalis filiformis 
Oxalis flagellata 
Oxalis flava 
Oxalis flaviuscula 
Oxalis florida 
Oxalis fourcadei 
Oxalis foveolata 
Oxalis fragilis 
Oxalis frutescens 
Oxalis fruticosa 
Oxalis furcillata 
Oxalis gagneorum 
Oxalis gardneriana 
Oxalis geralensis 
Oxalis giftbergensis 
Oxalis glabra 
Oxalis glauca 
Oxalis glaucescens 
Oxalis goetzei 
Oxalis goniorhiza 
Oxalis goyazensis 
Oxalis gracilipes 
Oxalis gracilis 
Oxalis grammopetala 
Oxalis grammophylla 
Oxalis grandis 
Oxalis gregaria 
Oxalis griffithii 
Oxalis grisea 
Oxalis gyrorhiza 
Oxalis haedulipes 
Oxalis hedysarifolia 
Oxalis hedysaroides 
Oxalis heidelbergensis 
Oxalis helicoides 
Oxalis hepatica 
Oxalis hernandesii 
Oxalis herrerae 
Oxalis heterophylla 
Oxalis hirsuta 
Oxalis hirsutibulba 
Oxalis hirsutissima 
Oxalis hirta 
Oxalis hispidula 
Oxalis hochreutineri 
Oxalis holosericea 
Oxalis huantensis 
Oxalis humbertii 
Oxalis humblotii 
Oxalis hyalotricha 
Oxalis hygrophila 
Oxalis hypopilina 
Oxalis hypsophila 
Oxalis illinoensis 
Oxalis imbricata 
Oxalis impatiens 
Oxalis inaequalis 
Oxalis incarnata 
Oxalis inconspicua 
Oxalis integra 
Oxalis involuta 
Oxalis ioeides 
Oxalis irreperta 
Oxalis jacquiniana 
Oxalis jamesonii 
Oxalis jasminifolia 
Oxalis johnstonii 
Oxalis juruensis 
Oxalis kalbreyeri 
Oxalis kamiesbergensis 
Oxalis killipii 
Oxalis knuthiana 
Oxalis kollmannii 
Oxalis kuhlmannii 
Oxalis laciniata 
Oxalis lanata 
Oxalis lasiandra 
Oxalis lasiopetala 
Oxalis lasiorhiza 
Oxalis latemucronata 
Oxalis latifolia 
Oxalis lawsonii 
Oxalis laxa 
Oxalis laxicaulis 
Oxalis leipoldtii 
Oxalis leptocalyx 
Oxalis leptogramma 
Oxalis leptopodes 
Oxalis lespedezioides 
Oxalis leucolepis 
Oxalis leucophylla 
Oxalis levis 
Oxalis libertatis 
Oxalis lichenoides 
Oxalis linarantha 
Oxalis lindaviana 
Oxalis lindneri 
Oxalis linearis 
Oxalis lineolata 
Oxalis linoides 
Oxalis livida 
Oxalis lomana 
Oxalis longissima 
Oxalis loricata 
Oxalis lotoides 
Oxalis louisae 
Oxalis lucumayensis 
Oxalis luederitzii 
Oxalis lunulata 
Oxalis luteola 
Oxalis macbridei 
Oxalis macra 
Oxalis macrantha 
Oxalis macrocarpa 
Oxalis macropoda 
Oxalis madrensis 
Oxalis magellanica 
Oxalis magnifica 
Oxalis magnifolia 
Oxalis mandioccana 
Oxalis marcapatensis 
Oxalis marlothii 
Oxalis massoniana 
Oxalis matancillae 
Oxalis mathewsii 
Oxalis medicaginea 
Oxalis megalorrhiza 
Oxalis meisneri 
Oxalis melanograpta 
Oxalis melanosticta 
Oxalis melilotoides 
Oxalis melindae 
Oxalis metcalfei 
Oxalis microcarpa 
Oxalis microdonta 
Oxalis minima 
Oxalis minuta 
Oxalis mira 
Oxalis mirbelii 
Oxalis modestior 
Oxalis mollis 
Oxalis mollissima 
Oxalis monochasiata 
Oxalis monophylla 
Oxalis montana 
Oxalis monticola 
Oxalis moqueguensis 
Oxalis morelosii 
Oxalis morenoensis 
Oxalis morronei 
Oxalis mucronulata 
Oxalis multicaulis 
Oxalis muscoides 
Oxalis myriophylla 
Oxalis nahuelhuapiensis 
Oxalis namaquana 
Oxalis natans 
Oxalis nelsonii 
Oxalis neuwiedii 
Oxalis nidulans 
Oxalis niederleiniana 
Oxalis niederleinii 
Oxalis nigrescens 
Oxalis nipponica 
Oxalis nivea 
Oxalis noctiflora 
Oxalis nortieri 
Oxalis novae-caledoniae 
Oxalis novae-guineensis 
Oxalis novemfoliolata 
Oxalis nubigena 
Oxalis nudiflora 
Oxalis obliquifolia 
Oxalis obtriangulata 
Oxalis obtusa 
Oxalis oculifera 
Oxalis odonellii 
Oxalis odorata 
Oxalis oligophylla 
Oxalis oligotricha 
Oxalis orbicularis 
Oxalis oregana 
Oxalis oreithala 
Oxalis ornithopus 
Oxalis ortgiesii 
Oxalis orthopoda 
Oxalis ostenii 
Oxalis oulophora 
Oxalis ovalleana 
Oxalis pachyrrhiza 
Oxalis pallens 
Oxalis palmifrons 
Oxalis paludosa 
Oxalis papuana 
Oxalis paranaensis 
Oxalis pardalis 
Oxalis paucartambensis 
Oxalis pavonii 
Oxalis peduncularis 
Oxalis pendulifolia 
Oxalis penicillata 
Oxalis pennelliana 
Oxalis perdicaria 
Oxalis perennans 
Oxalis perineson 
Oxalis peruviana 
Oxalis pes-caprae 
Oxalis petiolulata 
Oxalis petraea 
Oxalis petricola 
Oxalis petrophila 
Oxalis phaeotricha 
Oxalis phaseolifolia 
Oxalis phloxidiflora 
Oxalis physocalyx 
Oxalis picchensis 
Oxalis pickeringii 
Oxalis pillansiana 
Oxalis pilosa 
Oxalis pilulifera 
Oxalis pinetorum 
Oxalis pinguiculacea 
Oxalis platylepis 
Oxalis pocockiae 
Oxalis polymorpha 
Oxalis polyphylla 
Oxalis polyrhiza 
Oxalis porphyriosiphon 
Oxalis potamophila 
Oxalis praetexta 
Oxalis pretoensis 
Oxalis primavera 
Oxalis primuloides 
Oxalis procumbens 
Oxalis psammophila 
Oxalis pseudocernua 
Oxalis pseudohirta 
Oxalis pseudolobata 
Oxalis pseudoviolacea 
Oxalis psilopoda 
Oxalis psoraleoides 
Oxalis ptychoclada 
Oxalis puberula 
Oxalis pulchella 
Oxalis pulvinata 
Oxalis punctata 
Oxalis punensis 
Oxalis purpurascens 
Oxalis purpurata 
Oxalis purpurea 
Oxalis pusilla 
Oxalis pycnophylla 
Oxalis pyrenea 
Oxalis reclinata 
Oxalis recticaulis 
Oxalis reflexa 
Oxalis refracta 
Oxalis renifolia 
Oxalis rhombeo-ovata 
Oxalis rhombifolia 
Oxalis rhomboidea 
Oxalis ricardii 
Oxalis rigidicaulis 
Oxalis riparia 
Oxalis robinsonii 
Oxalis robusta 
Oxalis rosea 
Oxalis roselata 
Oxalis rosettifolia 
Oxalis rubens 
Oxalis rubricallosa 
Oxalis rubropunctata 
Oxalis rugeliana 
Oxalis rupestris 
Oxalis rusbyi 
Oxalis rutenbergii 
Oxalis salteri 
Oxalis salteriana 
Oxalis salticola 
Oxalis saltusbelli 
Oxalis salvadorensis 
Oxalis sandemanii 
Oxalis san-miguelii 
Oxalis sarmentosa 
Oxalis scandens 
Oxalis schaeferi 
Oxalis scoparia 
Oxalis sellowiana 
Oxalis sellowii 
Oxalis semiloba 
Oxalis semitruncata 
Oxalis senecta 
Oxalis sepalosa 
Oxalis sepium 
Oxalis serpens 
Oxalis setosa 
Oxalis shibeishanensis 
Oxalis simplex 
Oxalis simplicifolia 
Oxalis sleumeri 
Oxalis smithiana 
Oxalis solomonii 
Oxalis sonderiana 
Oxalis spiralis 
Oxalis spruceana 
Oxalis squamata 
Oxalis squarrosa 
Oxalis staffordiana 
Oxalis stellata 
Oxalis stenopetala 
Oxalis stenoptera 
Oxalis stenorhyncha 
Oxalis stictocheila 
Oxalis stokoei 
Oxalis stricta 
Oxalis strictula 
Oxalis strigosa 
Oxalis suavis 
Oxalis subacaulis 
Oxalis suborbiculata 
Oxalis subsessilis 
Oxalis subvillosa 
Oxalis suksdorfii 
Oxalis suteroides 
Oxalis tabaconasensis 
Oxalis tacorensis 
Oxalis telmatica 
Oxalis tenella 
Oxalis teneriensis 
Oxalis tenerrima 
Oxalis tenuifolia 
Oxalis tenuipes 
Oxalis tenuis 
Oxalis tessmannii 
Oxalis tetraphylla 
Oxalis texana 
Oxalis thelyoxys 
Oxalis thompsoniae 
Oxalis tomentosa 
Oxalis tortuosa 
Oxalis tragopoda 
Oxalis trianae 
Oxalis triangularis 
Oxalis trichophylla 
Oxalis trilliifolia 
Oxalis trollii 
Oxalis truncatula 
Oxalis tuberosa 
Oxalis tysonii 
Oxalis uliginosa 
Oxalis umbraticola 
Oxalis valdiviensis 
Oxalis vargasii 
Oxalis variifolia 
Oxalis veadeirosensis 
Oxalis velutina 
Oxalis versicolor 
Oxalis villosula 
Oxalis violacea 
Oxalis violacella 
Oxalis virgata 
Oxalis virginea 
Oxalis virgosa 
Oxalis viscosa 
Oxalis vulcanicola 
Oxalis weberbaueri 
Oxalis westii 
Oxalis williamsii 
Oxalis wurdackii 
Oxalis xantha 
Oxalis xerophyton 
Oxalis xiphophylla 
Oxalis yacutulensis 
Oxalis yungasensis 
Oxalis zamorana 
Oxalis zeekoevleyensis 
Oxalis zeyheri

References

Oxalis